Maccabi Kiryat Motzkin is a professional basketball club based in Kiryat Motzkin in the Haifa District of Israel. The team plays in the Israeli National League.

History
Maccabi Kiryat Motzkin was founded in 1955. They have played in the Israeli Premier League from 1958 until 1966.

In the 2018-19 season, They have reached the 2019 Israeli National League Playoffs as the second seed, but they eventually were eliminated by Hapoel Galil Elyon in the Semifinals.

Current roster

Notable players

References

External links
Eurobasket profile
Safsal profile
Facebook page

Basketball teams established in 1955
Basketball teams in Israel
Former Israeli Basketball Premier League teams